The Benefactor (originally titled Franny) is a 2015 American drama film written and directed by Andrew Renzi. Starring Richard Gere, Dakota Fanning, Theo James, and Clarke Peters, the film premiered at the Tribeca Film Festival on April 17, 2015. It was released in the United States on January 15, 2016, in a limited release and through video on demand by Samuel Goldwyn Films.

Synopsis
A wealthy man (Richard Gere) feels responsible for the deaths of two married friends, leading him to ingratiate himself into the lives of their daughter (Dakota Fanning) and her husband (Theo James). But their friendship takes a dark turn when he grows obsessed with the couple.

Cast
 Richard Gere as Francis "Franny" Watts
 Dakota Fanning as Olivia
 Theo James as Luke
 Clarke Peters as Dr. Romano
 Brian Anthony Wilson as Jesse
 Dylan Baker as Bobby
 Cheryl Hines as Mia
 Dennisha Pratt as Sharon
 Lyssa Roberts as Molly
 Roy James Wilson as Charlie
 Tibor Feldman as Dr. Sam
 Matthew and Michael Daisher as Toby

Production
Andrew Renzi developed the script at the 2013 Sundance Screenwriters Lab.  In August 2013, it was announced that it would be produced by Treehouse Pictures, TideRock Media, and Big Shoes Media, with Richard Gere cast to portray the role of Franny, and Andrew Renzi directing.   Treehouse Pictures had produced Gere's 2012 film Arbitrage.

In September 2013, it was announced that Dakota Fanning and Theo James had joined, portraying the roles of Olivia and Luke respectively.

Principal photography began on October 21, 2013, in Philadelphia.

Release
The Benefactor premiered at the Tribeca Film Festival on April 17, 2015. On May 1, 2015, Samuel Goldwyn Films acquired U.S distribution rights. It went onto screen at the Champs-Élysées Film Festival on June 13, 2015. The film was released in Italy on December 23, 2015, under its original name Franny. It was released in the United States on January 15, 2016, in a limited release and through video on demand.

Critical reception
The film received negative reviews from critics. On Rotten Tomatoes it achieves a score of 25%, an average rating of 4.2/10, sampled from 52 reviews. The consensus states: "The Benefactor has Richard Gere and Dakota Fanning, but no clear idea of what to do with either of them, resulting in a drama that never comes anywhere near its intriguing potential." Metacritic, gives a rating of 39 out of 100, based on 16 reviews, indicating "generally unfavorable reviews".

References

External links
 

2015 films
2015 drama films
American drama films
Films shot in Philadelphia
Samuel Goldwyn Films films
2010s English-language films
2010s American films